Bu Rusi station is a railway station located in Bu Rusi Subdistrict, Mueang Surin District, Surin Province.

References 

Railway stations in Thailand
Surin province